Deh Chil (also Romanized as Deh Chīl) is a village in Eslamabad Rural District, in the Central District of Jiroft County, Kerman Province, Iran. At the 2006 census, its population was 21, in 6 families.

References 

Populated places in Jiroft County